Daisuke Tsuda may refer to:

Daisuke Tsuda (musician) (born 1977), vocalist of Maximum the Hormone
Daisuke Tsuda (journalist) (born 1973), Japanese journalist